Joseph Fallon (born 24 July 1897, date of death unknown) was a Belgian equestrian. He competed in two events at the 1924 Summer Olympics.

References

External links
 

1897 births
Year of death missing
Belgian male equestrians
Olympic equestrians of Belgium
Equestrians at the 1924 Summer Olympics
Place of birth missing